Boston Business School was established in 1914 to provide technical training education to the people of Boston, Massachusetts. It was located just outside Dudley Street in the Roxbury section of Boston and moved to Commonwealth Ave. in Boston. It was founded as Boston Clerical School and was established within Roxbury High School. The school was known by all of the businesses in Boston and around the world because of its high ethics and student achievement. All students had to keep a 90% or above average in order to pass all classes given.

The school merged with Roxbury Community College in 1984.  Records are available at Registrar's Office.

In 2020 the school reopened its doors as an International educational facility, keeping the focus on teaching advanced business programs online, such as MBA and Mini-MBA. The first international program was launched at the beginning of 2021.

Notable graduates
Richard Scarry (studied but did not graduate), children's book author and illustrator

References 

Business schools in Massachusetts
Defunct universities and colleges in Massachusetts
Historically black universities and colleges in the United States
Educational institutions established in 1914
1914 establishments in Massachusetts